Strigulaceae is a family of lichen-forming fungi, one of two families in the order Strigulales (class Dothideomycetes). Recent (2020) molecular analysis of the type genus, Strigula, has led to a reallocation of the foliicolous species into six genera that correspond to well-delimited clades with diagnostic phenotype features.

Genera
Discosiella  – 1 sp.
Flavobathelium  – 1 sp.
Oletheriostrigula  – 1 sp.
Phyllobathelium  – 8 spp.
Phyllocratera  – 2 spp.
Phylloporis  – 6 spp.
Puiggariella  – 3 spp.
Raciborskiella  – 2 spp.
Racoplaca  – 5 spp.
Serusiauxiella  – 3 spp.
Strigula  – ca. 60 spp.

References

Dothideomycetes
Dothideomycetes families
Lichen families
Taxa described in 1898
Taxa named by Alexander Zahlbruckner